React Media, LLC (also known as React; formerly as Fine Brothers Entertainment) is an American media company, founded by brothers Benny Fine (born March 19, 1981) and Rafi Fine (born June 9, 1983), creators and media entrepreneurs. React Media produces the React video series, their several timed-spoiler series, narrative web series, and created a "transmedia" sitcom on YouTube, MyMusic.

The Fines have been creating content since 2003. React Media has many large digital channels on various social media platforms. The company's YouTube channels include REACT, FBE Official, and People vs Food. The company also produces channels on Facebook (FBE, FBE Shows, Do They Know It, What Would My Kid Do, and Reverse Ratings), Snapchat (Try Not To and React) and Instagram's IGTV. React has produced multiple shows (React to That, Celebs React, Six Degrees of Everything, Emo Dad, and Sing It!), and released F the Prom, their first feature film, in 2017.

FBE has over eight billion views and over 32 million subscribers. They are one of the few companies to have two YouTube channels with over 10 million subscribers. Because of the controversy over an attempt to license and trademark the term "React", as well as the names of their series, React Media's channels lost hundreds of thousands of subscribers in early 2016.

Early life and career
The brothers grew up in the 1990s in an Orthodox Jewish family in Brooklyn. The Fine Brothers stated they had been making videos almost their entire life; Benny, being the elder brother, would "rope [Rafi] into making all kinds of weird stuff". New York magazine detailed the two "started recording comedy sketches as adolescents, when they got their first video camera". They spent most of their teen years in Sullivan County, New York. Benny started college at age 15, while Rafi attended Dickinson College for two years before transferring to Hunter College, where he got a degree in film studies. The two began entertaining their friends with short sketches and full-length comedies shot with action figures.

The brothers said they created a live action feature in 2000 that made its way into comedy film festivals, and that they were planning to create a feature each year, hoping one would soon help them break into Hollywood. Despite winning young filmmaker awards, they soon concluded this method would not be the best path and decided their future was on the internet, which they viewed at the time as the new film festival. The brothers created their first website in 2003 and uploaded their first web video in 2004.

In summer 2020, the Fine Brothers left their own company after a video resurfaced which showed Benny Fine in blackface as part of a Degrassi parody by Shane Dawson.

History of the company

The Fine brothers made YouTube their full time jobs in July 2010.

FBE found success on YouTube where their main channel, TheFineBros (later renamed Fine Brothers Entertainment, and currently FBE), has more than 19 million subscribers and 7.8 billion video views as of May 2019. FBE has a secondary channel called FBE2, launched on May 14, 2009. A third channel was launched on July 22, 2014, called React, to expand their React content.

FBE soon joined the Maker Studios venture and said after speaking with Shane Dawson about a plan for the project, "We were the head of production and head of creative." The duo ran Maker Studios throughout 2009 and were responsible for the early success and planning for what became known as multi-channel networks (MCNs). They have since been vocal advocates for fair treatment of creators by the networks.

On their main channel, FBE upload a multitude of series, creating some of the most popular scripted, narrative, and unscripted series in web history including their award-winning and notable reaction series. They release behind-the-scenes content, as well as clips from their news podcast All We Know on the secondary channel. On October 16, 2010, they uploaded the first episode of Kids React. This was the first series in what would later become a notable React franchise on YouTube.

Aside from the popular series that the brothers have directed, produced, and uploaded, the duo has uploaded popular interactive YouTube videos. The company's channels are under the YouTube partner program, allowing them to earn money from ad revenues on their videos. Ford and Comedy Central have sponsored them.

FBE has collaborated in a variety of ways, including writing, directing and producing with other popular YouTubers like Shane Dawson, ShayCarl, and KassemG. They have collaborated in many ways with others, including on their YouTubers React show and with top YouTube channels such as Smosh and PewDiePie.

The Fine Brothers were guest judges on the second season of the web series Internet Icon in 2013. In December 2013, the duo left Revision3 to sign with Fullscreen though remained vocal about YouTube multi-channel networks, devoting a segment in their update vlog series, Fine Time, discussing how to navigate them.

On April 30, 2014, it was announced that a spin-off of FBE's React series called React to That was going to be aired on Nickelodeon. FBE said in an episode of Fine Time, however, that they planned on continuing to upload YouTube videos consistently. Nickelodeon aired 12 episodes of the show. The brothers also created and hosted the TV series Six Degrees of Everything that aired on TruTV in 2015. In early 2016, New York detailed that their company employed around 50 people.

Websites of The Wall Street Journal, Time magazine, Variety, and MSNBC have featured FBE works.

Marc Hustvedt joined FBE as CEO in July 2018, coming from the New York-based digital brand Above Average. Prior to Above Average, Hustvedt was co-founder and CEO of Supergravity Pictures, a digital-first entertainment studio and distributor that was later acquired by Gunpowder & Sky. From 2011 to 2013, he was head of entertainment at Chill, a short-lived premium online video destination whose backers included WME. Hustvedt also is a co-founder of trade publication Tubefilter and the Streamy Awards.

At the start of the year 2019, FBE acquired Officially Pinned, an upstart that creates collectible pins in collaboration with top creators such as Shane Dawson, DangMattSmith, Danny Casale, jennxpenn and many more. Officially Pinned gets certified approval from creators and rights-holding partners to vend the pins and works directly with the parties involved to collaborate on the designs—hence the "official" part of the name. Disney pin-trading culture inspired Officially Pinned.

FBE partnered with the interactive video company Eko in July 2019 to produce 12-plus interactive TV pilots that consist of scripted and unscripted formats and game shows and socially driven experiences with the potential to turn them into full series. Eko and FBE teamed up on the production of Epic Night, a four-episode branching-narrative series about a college-party adventure. For the Eko partnership, FBE established an Interactive Content Lab to expand the studio's interactive storytelling capabilities by developing, funding and shopping new formats.

From March to August 2020, the company began working in quarantine during the COVID-19 lockdown.

In September 2020, the company announced the rebranding of their channels FBE, FBE2 and REACT as REACT, FBE, and REPLAY, respectively. FBE began restructuring, which lead to the layoffs of 17 employees in December 2020.

YouTube series

React series on FBE Channel and React Channel

FBE launched a series titled Kids React on October 16, 2010, the first video being Kids React to Viral Videos #1 (Double Rainbow, Obama Fail, Twin Rabbits and Snickers Halloween). The Kids React series features The Fine Brothers, off-camera, showing kids several viral videos or popular YouTubers and having the kids react to them.

The series led to spin-offs uploaded on the company's channel, featuring kids, teens, elders, staff, adults (including sub-branches of college kids, parents, etc.) and YouTubers. Because of the increasing success of the React franchise, FBE, in collaboration with Nick Cannon, later developed a television series for Nickelodeon, titled React to That. Later, FBE launched a separate "React" YouTube channel, with additional reaction-related videos, including remixes of past reaction footage and cast members reacting to video games, among other content.

MyMusic

FBE is the creator of MyMusic, a sitcom show funded by YouTube's $100 million original channel initiative. MyMusic features a main ensemble cast of Adam Busch, Chris Clowers, Jack Douglass, Tania Gunadi, Grace Helbig, Lainey Lipson (who later appears in Adults React), Jarrett Sleeper and Mychal Thompson and has featured many guest stars, with members of both Kids React and Teens React also appearing. The series has an interactive transmedia aspect, which FBE has spoken on, saying, "To us, new media should be 'new' – and just not just a passive experience. The ability to create new storytelling elements and new ways to entertain audiences is what is so motivating about being a creator at this time." The show revolves around MyMusic, a company led by CEO Indie (portrayed by Adam Busch) who is portrayed as a stereotypical modern-day hipster. Another character on the show, Metal (portrayed by Jarrett Sleeper), is based on the brothers' teenage years. Fine said, "The Metal character comes directly from us when we were teenagers. We were metalheads, full-on." MyMusic has a separate channel on YouTube from the main FBE channel (MyMusicShow), which had over 381,000 subscribers and 28.9 million video views as of July 7, 2013. MyMusic was nominated for nine Streamy Awards in the 3rd installment of the event, with three of the nominations going to the Fine Brothers. The second season premiered on August 20, 2013.

Sing It!

Sing It! is a musical situation comedy streaming television series created by the Fine Brothers. It is executive produced by Benny Fine, Rafi Fine, Max Benator, Todd Lieberman, David Hoberman, Laurie Zaks, Barry Safchik, and Michael Platt, and produced by Mandeville Films, Potvin Sucks Productions, and Fine Brothers Entertainment. The pilot premiered on April 21, 2016, during the Tribeca Film Festival. The show premiered on May 25, 2016, on YouTube Red, a paid service of streaming original series and films, similar to Netflix. It stars Mircea Monroe, Mark Sullivan, Debby Ryan, Preston Jones, Alex Désert, Todrick Hall, Missi Pyle and Ace Young. On December 3, 2017, creator Benny Fine confirmed on his Twitter account the series would not return for a second season.

Other YouTube series

Spoilers
FBE had a popular series where they spoil a variety of topics ranging from books to films to video games. The first episode of their Spoiler series, 100 Movie Spoilers in 5 Minutes – (Movie Endings Ruined) was uploaded on YouTube on November 11, 2008. With over 2.7 million video views as of July 28, 2014, the episode is also the most popular of the series. FBE also uploaded a video containing spoilers of the first seven Harry Potter films in roughly seven minutes on July 13, 2011. In six minutes, FBE spoiled 47 years of the popular series, Doctor Who, and released subsequent sequels to prepare for the premieres of series eight and nine. Other TV shows that have had spoiler videos made about them include Game of Thrones, Breaking Bad, The Walking Dead and Orange Is the New Black. In addition, FBE put up a video each month spoiling 50 viral videos that have circulated on YouTube and other sources during the previous month.

Lost: What Will Happen Next?
FBE created a show titled Lost: What Will Happen Next?, which is a parody show based on the TV series Lost. The show premiered on January 24, 2008, and was the  first long-running series on the Fine Brothers channel. The show lasted 19 episodes and ended on November 1, 2010. The show features several characters from other fictional universes such as the Avatar and the Star Wars universe. FBE collaborated with Rhett and Link to create a parody song of Lost.

Controversies

React World
On January 26, 2016, FBE announced they would license and trademark their existing React series and let creators create their own "React" content. In particular, FBE applied to trademark, among other terms, the word "react", which is used in the title of many other YouTube videos unrelated to FBE's YouTube channel. The announcement was met with a backlash from some of their viewers and fellow YouTube content creators, many of whom believed FBE was attempting to prohibit the creation of reaction videos by people unaffiliated with their channel. In response, the company promised they would "not be trying to take revenue from other types of reaction videos, and will not be copyright-striking". However, other YouTubers reported copyright related takedowns of videos containing FBE footage. There were also reports that another YouTube channel had produced Seniors React videos just prior to FBE's Elders React series. The backlash led to a dramatic drop in subscribers, with upwards of 675,000 accounts collectively unsubscribing from the React and FBE channels in protest as of February 22, 2016.

On February 1, 2016, FBE stated they had rescinded all React trademarks and trademark applications, discontinued the React World program, and released all previous Content ID claims. In addition, FBE removed their original React World announcement video, and their update video, which addressed the initial backlash.

Allegations of racial discrimination
In June 2020, many former employees spoke out about their experiences working at FBE, which included allegations of racism and sexism by the company. In January 2021, Insider published a report, which contained allegations the company cultivated casual racism. One employee claimed that she was told at times that having a reactor with lighter skin on the left of video thumbnails, which was said to be where viewers would tend to see them first, "appeals to the fans". Insider said that in 434 thumbnails that included one person of color and one white person, 238 of them (55%), had the white person on the left side. People interviewed for the article alleged white people were favored to appear in React videos.

Filmography

Accolades
This is a list of awards, nominations, recognition and achievements received by the Fine Brothers during their career.

References

Citations

References

Sources

Notes

External links

 

Entertainment companies of the United States
English-language YouTube channels
Entertainment-related YouTube channels
Web series producers
YouTube channels launched in 2007
American companies established in 2007
Entertainment companies established in 2007
YouTube controversies